Mansac is a commune in the Corrèze department in central France. La Rivière-de-Mansac station has rail connections to Brive-la-Gaillarde, Ussel and Bordeaux.

Population

See also
Communes of the Corrèze department

References

Communes of Corrèze